Lieutenant-Colonel Lord John George Lennox (3 October 1793 – 10 November 1873), was a British soldier and Whig politician.

John George Lennox was born 3 October 1793, the second son of Charles Lennox, 4th Duke of Richmond, and the former Lady Charlotte Gordon. Lennox joined the Army in 1811 and was an ADC to the Duke of Wellington from 1813, at Waterloo and up to 1818. He was returned to Parliament for Chichester in 1819 (succeeding his father), a seat he held until 1831. He then represented Sussex between 1831 and 1832 and Sussex West between 1832 and 1841.

He was Lord of the Bedchamber to Prince Albert from 1840 until Albert's death in 1861.

Lennox married Louisa Fredericka, daughter of the Hon. John Rodney, in 1818. They had several children, including Major-General Augustus Lennox and General Sir Wilbraham Lennox. She died in January 1865. Lennox survived her by eight years and died in November 1873, aged 80.

References

External links 
 

1793 births
1873 deaths
Younger sons of dukes
Whig (British political party) MPs for English constituencies
Members of the Parliament of the United Kingdom for English constituencies
UK MPs 1818–1820
UK MPs 1820–1826
UK MPs 1826–1830
UK MPs 1830–1831
UK MPs 1831–1832
UK MPs 1832–1835
UK MPs 1835–1837
UK MPs 1837–1841